Giuseppe "Pino" Pinelli (21 October 1928 – 15 December 1969) was an Italian railroad worker and anarchist, who died while being detained by the Polizia di Stato in 1969. Pinelli was a member of the Milan-based anarchist association named Ponte della Ghisolfa. He was also the secretary of the Italian branch of the Anarchist Black Cross. His death, believed by many to have been caused by members of the police, inspired Nobel Prize laureate Dario Fo to write his famous play titled Accidental Death of an Anarchist.

Early life
Pinelli was born in Milan to Alfredo Pinelli and Rosa Malacarne. His family was working-class in one of the poorest areas of post-World War I Milan. Although he had to work many low income jobs, such as waiter and warehouseman, in order to make ends meet, he nonetheless found the time to read many books and become politically active throughout his youth. Among other political activities, he also worked with the anarchist group which published the weekly paper Il Libertario.

In 1954, he found work as a railroad fitter. In 1955, he married Licia Rognini, whom he had met at an evening class of Esperanto. During the 1960s, he continued anarchist activism. He organized young anarchists in the Gioventù Libertaria (Libertarian Youth) in 1962. He helped found the "Sacco and Vanzetti anarchist association" in 1965. He founded the Ponte della Ghisolfa association (named after the nearby bridge) in 1968.

Suspicious circumstances surrounding his death
On 12 December 1969, a bomb went off at the Piazza Fontana in Milan that killed 17 people and injured 88. Pinelli was picked up, along with other anarchists, for questioning regarding the attack. Just before midnight on 15 December 1969, Pinelli was seen to fall to his death from a fourth floor window of the Milan police station. Three police officers interrogating Pinelli, including Commissioner Luigi Calabresi, were put under investigation in 1971 for his death, but legal proceedings concluded it was due to accidental causes.

Pinelli's name has since been cleared, and the far-right Ordine Nuovo was accused of the 1969 Piazza Fontana bombing (in 2001, three neo-fascists were convicted, a sentence overturned in March 2004; a fourth defendant, Carlo Digilio, was a suspected CIA informant who became a witness for the state and received immunity from prosecution).

Calabresi was later killed by two shots from a revolver outside his home in 1972. In 1988, former Lotta Continua leader Adriano Sofri was arrested with Ovidio Bompressi and Giorgio Pietrostefani for Calabresi's murder. The charges against them were based on testimony provided, 16 years later, by Leonardo Marino, an ex-militant who confessed to the murder of Calabresi, under order from Adriano Sofri. Claiming his innocence, Sofri was finally convicted after a highly contentious trial, in 1997.

In popular culture
Pinelli's death is the inspiration for:
Dario Fo's play Accidental Death of an Anarchist, although in the original script his name was not mentioned explicitly.
The painting Funeral of the Anarchist Pinelli by Italian artist Enrico Baj.
The political documentary film 12 dicembre (1972) directed by Giovanni Bonfanti and based on an idea by Pier Paolo Pasolini.
The song Ballata per l'Anarchico Pinelli.
 The popular song La ballata del Pinelli.
 The movie Piazza Fontana: The Italian Conspiracy: Pinelli was portrayed by Pierfrancesco Favino.
Hints of his death are also in the songs Asilo 'Republic''' by Vasco Rossi and Quarant'anni by the Modena City Ramblers.

See also
Piazza Fontana bombing
Strategy of tension
Police brutality
Andrea Salsedo

Notes
 Italian justice has used a system of [state witnesses]'' "collaboratori di giustizia-collaborators with justice" to fight against terrorism and the mafia.

References

External links

La ballata del Pinelli (The ballad of Pinelli) – in Italian
2001 Conviction of the bombers 
Giuseppe Pinelli Page Daily Bleed's Anarchist Encyclopedia

1928 births
1969 deaths
Italian anarchists
Deaths related to the Years of Lead (Italy)
Anarcho-syndicalists
Deaths by defenestration
1969 murders in Italy
Murdered anarchists